The Immortal is a Canadian horror-based martial arts television series which aired from October 7, 2000 to June 2001 and had 22 episodes.

Plot
In 16th century Asia, Raphael Cain sees his wife slain and his daughter taken by supernatural villains from the underworld. He vows to pursue the demons through the centuries to kill them all and find his daughter, and with the help of a mystic, he is taught the magic—and samurai swordsmanship—it will require to accomplish this oath. His reluctant squire, Goodwin follows him through time and helps him in his quest. Now in the 21st century, Cain and Goodwin are joined by a psychologist, Sara Beckman, who studies otherworldly anomalies. Cain will need all the help he can get because now the lead demon, Mallos and his henchwoman, Vashista, are gathering power and making life in the 21st century America very uncomfortable.

Reception
M. Ray Lott in his book The American Martial Arts Film wrote that "the resemblance to Highlander is probably not coincidental. The show, which only lasted a year, boasted some good martial arts sequences and some really bad demons."

Cast

Episodes

References

External links
 

Canadian horror fiction television series
2000s Canadian science fiction television series
2000 Canadian television series debuts
2001 Canadian television series endings
English-language television shows
Martial arts television series
First-run syndicated television programs in the United States